Guillermo Lohmann Villena (1915–2005) was a Peruvian diplomat, historian, lawyer, and writer.

He is considered one of the most prolific Peruvian historians and the most important specialist in the viceregal era. He also served as Permanent Delegate of Peru to UNESCO from 1974 to 1977.

He attended the Deutsche Schule Alexander von Humboldt Lima (Colegio Peruano-Alemán Alexander von Humboldt).

References

Peruvian diplomats
20th-century Peruvian historians
Peruvian male writers
1915 births
2005 deaths
Peruvian people of German descent
Recipients of the Order of Isabella the Catholic
20th-century male writers